The Roman Catholic Diocese of Wuhu is a diocese located in the city of Wuhu in the Ecclesiastical province of Anqing in China.

History
 August 8, 1921: Established as the Apostolic Vicariate of Anhui 安徽 from the Apostolic Vicariate of Kiang-nan 江南)
 December 3, 1924: Renamed as Apostolic Vicariate of Wuhu 蕪湖
 April 11, 1946: Promoted as Diocese of Wuhu 蕪湖

Leadership
 Bishops of Wuhu (Roman rite)
 Bishop Zenón Arámburu Urquiola, S.J. (April 11, 1946 – April 4, 1969)
 Vicars Apostolic of Wuhu 蕪湖 (Roman Rite)
 Bishop Zenón Arámburu Urquiola, S.J. (July 7, 1936 – April 11, 1946)
 Bishop Vicente Huarte San Martín, S.J. (December 3, 1924 – August 23, 1935)
 Vicars Apostolic of Anhui 安徽 (Roman Rite)
 Bishop Vicente Huarte San Martín, S.J. (April 26, 1922 – December 3, 1924)

References

 GCatholic.org
 Catholic Hierarchy

1921 establishments in China
Christianity in Anhui
Christian organizations established in 1921
Wuhu
Wuhu
Wuhu